Chaleh Zamin (also Romanized as Chāleh Zamīn) is a village in Aliabad Rural District, in the Central District of Qaem Shahr County, Mazandaran Province, Iran. At the 2006 census, its population was 29, in 11 families.

References 

Populated places in Qaem Shahr County